Benjamin Lees (January 8, 1924 –  May 31, 2010) was an American composer of classical music.

Early life
Lees was born Benjamin George Lisniansky in Harbin, Manchuria, of Russian-Jewish descent. Lees was still an infant when his family emigrated to the United States and settled in California. He began piano lessons at 5 with Kiva Ihil Rodetsky of San Francisco. When he was seven years old, he became an American citizen. In 1939, he moved with his family to Los Angeles and continued studies in piano with Marguerite Bitter. In his early teens, he studied harmony and theory and began to compose.

After serving in the United States military, Lees studied composition under Halsey Stevens, as well as with Kalitz and Ingolf Dahl, at the University of Southern California in Los Angeles, California. Composer George Antheil, impressed by Lees' compositions, offered further tutelage; this period lasted four years, at the end of which Lees won a Fromm Foundation Award. Of Antheil, Lees declared: "He changed my life."

The receipt of a Guggenheim Fellowship in 1954 allowed him to live in Europe, realizing his goal of developing his individual style away from current fashions in the American art music scene and resulting in a number of mature and impressive works. Returning to the United States in 1961, he divided his time between composition and teaching at several institutions. These included the Peabody Conservatory (1962–64, 1966–68), Queens College (1964–66), the Manhattan School of Music (1972–74), and the Juilliard School (1976–77).

Compositions
Lees rejected atonalism and Americana in favor of classical structures. Niall O'Loughlin writes in The New Grove Dictionary of Music and Musicians, "From an early interest in the bittersweet melodic style of Prokofiev and the bizarre and surrealist aspects of Bartók's music, he progressed naturally under the unconventional guidance of Antheil." Lees' music is rhythmically active, with frequently changing accents and meter even in his early works, and is known for its semitonal inflections in melody and harmony.

In 1954, the NBC Symphony Orchestra performed his Profiles for Orchestra on a national radio broadcast. In 1970, Medea in Corinth, his one-act musical drama, was given its premiere at the Purcell Room, Queen Elizabeth Hall, London, and was subsequently broadcast by CBS Television in 1974. Other, notable works include Symphony No. 4: Memorial Candles, commissioned by the Dallas Symphony Orchestra in 1985 to commemorate the Holocaust, and Symphony No. 5: Kalmar Nyckel, written in 1986 to honor the founding of Wilmington, Delaware. (Kalmar Nyckel was the name of the ship that first carried the original settlers from Sweden to what would become Wilmington.) In 1994 Echoes of Normandy was commissioned by the Dallas Symphony Orchestra to commemorate the 50th anniversary of the D-Day landings. His 1998 Piano Trio no. 2, "Silent Voices" was written in Palm Springs.

Lees received a Grammy nomination for Kalmar Nyckel in 2003, following release of a recording by the German orchestra Staatsphilharmonie Rheinland-Pfalz under Stephen Gunzenhauser. He lost to Dominick Argento.

Personal life

Lees married Luba Leatrice Banks in 1948.  They had one daughter.  Lees donated his archive of manuscripts, sketches, scores, letters, photographs, articles, recordings and posters to Yale University. Shortly before his death at age 86, he emailed that he was, "busy as fleas in a circus". He died in Glen Cove, New York.

Awards and honors
1953: Fromm Foundation Award
1954: Guggenheim Fellowship
1955: Copley Medal
1956: Fulbright Fellowship
1958: UNESCO Award, Sir Arnold Bax Society Medal
1966: Guggenheim Fellowship
1985: Lancaster Symphony Orchestra's Composer's Award
2003: Grammy Nomination
National Patron of Delta Omicron, an international professional music fraternity.

Discography
 String Quartets Nos. 1, 5 and 6 (Naxos)
 Complete Violin Works of Benjamin Lees (Albany)
 Concerto for French Horn and Orchestra (New World)
 Violin Sonata No. 2 (Polystone)
 Concerto for Violin and Orchestra (VoxBox, EPR)
 Prologue, Capriccio and Epilog (CRI)
 Symphonies No. 2, No. 3 and No. 5, Etudes for Piano & Orchestra (Albany)
 Symphony No. 4: Memorial Candles (Naxos)
 Concerto No. 2 for Piano & Orchestra (Albany)
 Concerto No. 1 for Piano & Orchestra (Pierian)
 Piano Trio No. 2: Silent Voices (Albany)
 Passacaglia for Orchestra (Delos)
 Piano Sonata No. 4, Mirrors, Fantasy Variations  (Albany)
 Concerto for String Quartet and Orchestra (conducted by Igor Buketoff)

References
 O'Loughlin, Niall. "Lees, Benjamin". The New Grove Dictionary of Music and Musicians, second edition, edited by Stanley Sadie and John Tyrrell (London: Macmillan Publishers, 2001), 29 vols. .

Notes

External links
 Personal Page
 Magazine Article
 Benjamin Lees @ Boosey & Hawkes
 Interview with Benjamin Lees by Bruce Duffie, June 13, 1987
 , WNCN-FM, September 9, 1984

1924 births
2010 deaths
American male classical composers
American classical composers
Chinese people of Russian-Jewish descent
Chinese emigrants to the United States
American people of Russian-Jewish descent
Musicians from Palm Springs, California
Musicians from Harbin
Pupils of George Antheil
20th-century classical composers
21st-century classical composers
21st-century American composers
USC Thornton School of Music alumni
Peabody Institute faculty
Queens College, City University of New York faculty
Manhattan School of Music faculty
Juilliard School faculty
Jewish American classical composers
20th-century American composers
20th-century American male musicians
21st-century American male musicians
21st-century American Jews